Paracnemis is a genus of white-legged damselfly in the family Platycnemididae. There are at least two described species in Paracnemis.

Species
These two species belong to the genus Paracnemis:
 Paracnemis alluaudi Martin, 1903
 Paracnemis secundaris (Aguesse, 1968)

References

Further reading

 
 
 

Platycnemididae
Articles created by Qbugbot